Barbican is a type of fortified building.

Barbican may also refer to:

 Barbican (drink), a brand of malt beverage in Saudi Arabia and the UAE
 Barbican Estate, a residential estate in London
 Barbican Centre, an arts centre in London
 Barbican Conservatory, in London
 Barbican tube station, on the London Underground
 Barbican House, in Lewes, East Sussex
 Barbican, Plymouth, England
 Barbican Press, an independent publishing house 
 Warsaw Barbican
 Kraków Barbican
 Barbican F.C., Jamaican football club